Suvarnabhumi Airport (from Sanskrit  (Suvarṇabhūmi), literally 'golden land') , also known unofficially as Bangkok International Airport, is the main international airport serving Bangkok, Thailand. The airport is also a major Cargo Air Freight Hub (20th busiest in 2019), which has a designated Airport Free Zone, as well as road links to the Eastern Economic Corridor (EEC) on Motorway 7.

Etymology
The name Suvarnabhumi is Sanskrit for "land of gold" (Devanagari:सुवर्णभूमि  IAST: Suvarṇabhūmi; Suvarṇa is "gold", Bhūmi is 'land'; literally "golden land"). The name was chosen by the late King Bhumibol Adulyadej whose name includes Bhūmi, referring to the Buddhist golden kingdom, thought to have been to the east of the Ganges, possibly somewhere in Southeast Asia. In Thailand, government proclamations and national museums insist that Suvarnabhumi was somewhere on the coast of the central plains, near the ancient city of U Thong, which might be the origin of the Indianised Dvaravati culture. Although the claims have not been substantiated, the Thai government named the new Bangkok airport Suvarnabhumi Airport, in celebration of this tradition.

History

The airport is currently the main hub for Thai Airways International, Thai Smile and Bangkok Airways, as well as the operating base for Thai VietJet Air, Thai AirAsia and Thai AirAsia X. It also serves as regional gateway and connecting point for various foreign carriers connecting to Asia, Oceania, Europe and Africa.

Suvarnabhumi was officially opened for limited domestic flight service on 15 September 2006, and opened for most domestic and all international commercial flights on 28 September 2006.

The terminal building was designed by Helmut Jahn of Murphy/Jahn Architects. It was constructed primarily by ITO JV. The airport had the world's tallest free-standing control tower from 2006 to 2014, and the world's fourth largest single-building airport terminal.

Suvarnabhumi is the 17th busiest airport in the world, eleventh busiest airport in Asia, and the busiest in the country, having handled 60 million passengers in 2017, and is also a major air cargo hub, with a total of 95 airlines. On social networks, Suvarnabhumi was the world's most popular site for taking Instagram photographs in 2012.

Suvarnabhumi reassigned the IATA airport code, BKK, from Don Mueang after the previous airport ceased international commercial flights. Motorway 7 connects the airport, Bangkok, and the heavily industrial eastern seaboard of Thailand, where most export manufacturing takes place.

During the COVID-19 pandemic, the airport was temporarily converted to a hospital and vaccination centre.

Land purchase, initial early phase of construction
The need for the new airport was recognized in 1973 when 8,000 acres of land was purchased 40 kilometres east of Bangkok. The site, known as Cobra Swamp, was drained and named Suvarnabhumi, meaning "realm of gold". On 14 October 1973, student-led protests led to the overthrow of the military government of Prime Minister Thanom Kittikachorn and the project was shelved.

After a series of ups and downs, the "New Bangkok International Airport" company (NBIA) was formed in 1996. Due to political and economic instabilities, notably the Asian financial crisis of 1997, construction did not begin until six years later in January 2002 by the government of Thaksin Shinawatra.

Airport tests, and official opening
The airport was due to open in late 2004, but a series of budget overruns, construction flaws, and allegations of corruption plagued the project.

A further delay was caused by the discovery that the airport had been built over an old graveyard. Superstitious construction workers claimed to have seen ghosts there. On 23 September 2005, the Thai airports authority held a ceremony where 99 Buddhist monks chanted to appease the spirits.

Full tests of the airport took place on 3 and 29 July 2006. Six airlines — Thai Airways International, Nok Air, Thai AirAsia, Bangkok Airways, PBair, and One-Two-GO — used the airport as a base for twenty domestic flights. The first international test flights were conducted on 1 September 2006. Two Thai Airways aircraft, a Boeing 747-400 and an Airbus A300-600, simultaneously departed the airport at 09:19 to Singapore and Hong Kong respectively. At 15:50 the same aircraft flew back and made simultaneous touchdowns on runways 19L and 19R. These test flights demonstrated the readiness of the airport to handle traffic.

On 15 September 2006, the airport started limited daily operations with Jetstar Asia Airways operating three Singapore to Bangkok flights.  Bangkok Airways moved to the airport on 21 September. AirAsia and Thai AirAsia followed on 25 September and on 26 September Nok Air moved to Suvarnabhumi Airport. During this initial phase, as well as in the previous tests, the airport used the temporary IATA code NBK.

Suvarnabhumi officially opened at 03:00 on 28 September 2006, taking over all flights from Don Mueang. The first flight to arrive was a Lufthansa Cargo flight LH8442 from Mumbai at 03:05. The first commercial arrival was Japan Airlines at 03:30. The first passenger arrival was Aerosvit flight VV171 from Kyiv at 04:30, and the first cargo departure was Saudi Arabian Airlines flight SV-984 to Riyadh at 05:00. Aerosvit also had the first passenger departure (VV172 to Kyiv) around 05:30.

Initial difficulties
Difficulties were reported in the first few days of the airport's operation. On the first day alone, sluggish luggage handling was common—the first passenger arrival by Aerosvit took an hour for the luggage to start coming out, and some flights did not have their luggage coming out even after four hours. Flights were delayed (Thai Airways claimed that 17 of 19 flights were delayed that day), and there were failures with the check-in system. Subsequent problems included the failure of the cargo computer system, and the departure boards displaying the wrong information, resulting in confused passengers (especially as unlike Don Mueang, there were no "final calls" issued).

Months after its opening, issues of congestion, construction quality, signage, provision of facilities, and soil subsidence continued to plague the project, prompting calls to reopen Don Mueang to allow for repairs to be made. Expert opinions varied widely on the extent of Suvarnabhumi's problems as well as their root cause. Most airlines stated that damage to the airport was minimal. Then Prime Minister Surayud Chulanont reopened Don Mueang for domestic flights on a voluntary basis on 16 February 2007, with 71 weekly flights moved back initially, but no international flights.

Capacity and safety issues

Tarmac problems
In January 2007, ruts were discovered in the runways at Suvarnabhumi. The east runway was scheduled to close for repairs. Expert opinions varied as to the cause of the ruts. Airport authorities and airline representatives maintained that the airport was still safe and resisted suggestions that the airport should be completely closed and all flights moved back to Don Mueang.

On 27 January 2007, the Department of Civil Aviation declined to renew the airport's safety certificate, which had expired the previous day. The ICAO requires that international airports hold aerodrome safety certificates, but Suvarnabhumi continued to operate because the ICAO requirement had yet to be adopted as part of Thai law.

As of early 2016, tarmac problems persisted at Suvarnabhumi. Soft spots on the tarmac, taxiways, and apron area had not been permanently fixed. Aircraft were getting stuck on the soft surfaces that are the result of sub-standard materials. "The constant resurfacing of the tarmac, taxiways and apron area with asphalt is an unacceptable patchwork solution. We literally need a "concrete" solution", said Tony Tyler, IATA's director general and CEO.

Plans to re-open Don Mueang for domestic flights
In January 2007, Thai Airways announced a plan to move some of its domestic operations back to Don Mueang International Airport due to overcrowding. Three days later, the Ministry of Transport recommended temporarily reopening Don Mueang while repair work on the runways at Suvarnabhumi proceeded. At that time, Thai Airways said it would shift most of its domestic flights back to Don Mueang while keeping flights with high international passenger connections such as Chiang Mai and Phuket at Suvarnabhumi. On 28 March 2009, Thai Airways discontinued all domestic flights from Don Mueang. Bangkok Airways and One-Two-GO Airlines had similar plans, but Bangkok Airways remained at Suvarnabhumi. Thai AirAsia said it would not move unless it could shift both its international and domestic operations, prompting them to stay at Suvarnabhumi for the time being. Nok Air and PBair were undecided, but Nok Air later relocated all flights to Don Mueang, where they operate today. As of January 2010, only Nok Air and One-Two-GO operated domestic flights from Don Mueang Airport.  PBair have ceased operations altogether. One-Two-GO was integrated into Orient Thai Airlines in July 2010, but continues to operate from Don Mueang Airport.
As of 1 October 2012, Air Asia has moved all of its Bangkok operations to Don Mueang International Airport (DMK) from Suvarnabhumi Airport (BKK).

Repair and upgrades
Airports of Thailand found that the cost of fixing 60 identified problems at the airport would be less than one percent of the total airline cost and the problems could be fixed in up to four to five years. Dr Narupol Chaiyut, a member of a committee overseeing service problems at the new airport, estimated that 70 percent of the problems would be fixed in 2007. Twenty of the 60 problems were successfully fixed by February 2007.

Architectural design

Suvarnabhumi Airport's main terminal roof is designed with structural elements and bays placed in a cantilevered, wavelike form to appear to "float" over the concourse beneath. This overall design principle was to express the former essence of the site, from which water had to be drained before construction could begin. The eight composite 2,710-ton trusses supporting the canopy of the main terminal are essentially diagrams of the bending moments acting on them, with the greatest depth at mid-span and over the supports.

The result of Helmut Jahn's vision is a structure with performance materials serve in their total composition and in use more than in their conventional roles. This maximizes daylight use in comfort with substantial energy life-cycle cost savings. The installed cooling system reduced up to 50 percent compared to a conventional system. A translucent membrane with three layers was developed to mediate between the interior and exterior climate, dealing with noise and temperature transmission, while still allowing natural flow of daylight into building along with views of greenery outside.

Airport ranking
The airport was ranked number 48 among the world's top 100 airports in 2020. Other ASEAN airports in 2020 were ranked: Singapore Changi Airport, 1; Kuala Lumpur International Airport, 63; Jakarta, 35; Hanoi, 87. Suvarnabhumi was ranked 46 in 2019, 38 in 2017 and 36 in 2016. According to the Thailand Development Research Institute (TDRI) in 2018, the airport's ranking had not improved over the past six years. Customer complaints include: lengthy immigration waiting times; transit day room issues; insufficient numbers of chairs and phone charging points; insufficient English-speaking staff; and poor information displays.

Events

On 25 January 2007, due to work upgrading the taxiways which suffered from small cracks, a few incoming flights were delayed and several flights were safely diverted to U-Tapao International Airport in Rayong Province.

On 26 November 2008, an illegal occupation of the airport took place by People's Alliance for Democracy, closing the departure lounge and blocking exits and leaving almost 3,000 passengers stranded in the main terminal and another 350,000 stranded inside the country, as all flights were grounded. The People's Alliance for Democracy seized the control tower at 12:00. On 2 December 2008, protesters agreed to leave the airport as they had been illegally protesting and permitted the resumption of flights. Security checks, clean-ups, and re-certification once the illegal occupation ended delayed the airport from being fully functional until 5 December 2008.

In January 2021, a motorist drove his car through security gates and onto the tarmac at the airport while it was in use. It was later revealed that the driver had been under the influence of methamphetamine, which were also discovered in the trunk of the car. The driver claimed that he had taken a wrong turn.

Predatory irregularities
Petty thieves and confidence men, the majority of them illegal taxi drivers or tour guides, are known to prey on tourists in the arrival hall. They belong to politically well connected criminal groups: Kamnan Samruay, Boonruang Srisang, Sak Pakphanang, the Pattaya Mafia and Phuyai Daeng. Evicting them has proved difficult as they allegedly are well connected. (The head of the Pirap gang is supposedly related to an Airports of Thailand executive, while the Phuyai Daeng has ties to influential civil servants in Samut Prakan.)

On 1 October 2010, two hundred armed men occupied the airport's parking area for an hour, blocking the building's entrances and seizing ticket booths to collect fares from motorists. Airport security personnel failed to respond, reportedly because of an internal dispute within the parking management company, the firm contracted to run the parking facilities.

Airport terminal and future expansion

Airport terminal
Costing an estimated 155 billion baht (US$5 billion), the airport has two parallel runways (60 m wide, 4,000 m and 3,700 m long) and two parallel taxiways to accommodate simultaneous departures and arrivals. It has a total of 120 parking bays (51 with contact gates and 69 remote gates), with five of these capable of accommodating the Airbus A380. Suvarnabhumi Airport has 72 jet bridges and 69 non-jet bridges. Additionally, flights are able to park at remote locations on the ramp, from which airport buses transport passengers to and from the terminal. Suvarnabhumi Airport has 18 jet bridges and 6 non-jet bridges for Airbus A380.

The airport's two runways can accommodate 64 flights per hour. At peak times the runways average 63 flights per hour. In April 2019 the Thai cabinet approved a sum of 21.8 billion baht for the construction of a third runway. Construction will start in 2019 and be completed in 2021. The third runway will accommodate a maximum of 30 flights per hour. The project will be managed by Airports of Thailand (AOT).

The main passenger terminal building, with a capacity of handling 76 flight operations per hour, co-locates the international and domestic terminals, though assigning them to different parts of the concourse. In the initial phase of construction, it was capable of handling 45 million passengers and three million tonnes of cargo per year. Above the underground rail link station and in front of the passenger terminal building is a 600-room hotel operated by Accor Group under the Novotel brand.

From the opening of Suvarnabhumi in 2006 to early 2017, eight people had fallen to their deaths from upper-floor walkways, prompting the airport to spend 33 million baht in 2013 building glass barriers to prevent people from falling and/or taking their lives.

Future expansion
By mid-2015, the airport was handling more than 800 flights per day, higher than its 600-flight capacity. It has exceeded its capacity of 45 million passengers per year.

Airports of Thailand (AOT) approved an investment budget for the expansion of Suvarnabhumi Airport and construction is expected to be completed by April 2023.The plan was to strengthen Suvarnabhumi Airport's position as a regional aviation hub. Phase Two would raise the airport's capacity to 65 million passengers a year and would be undertaken in parallel with the construction of a new domestic terminal. The new domestic terminal will be intended to accommodate more than 30 million passengers annually.

The two expansion projects are part of the overall airport enlargement that would see Suvarnabhumi raise its annual passenger handling capacity to 125 million passengers, 90 million international and 35 million domestic passengers by 2024 at an estimated cost of 163 billion baht (US$5.25 billion/€3.62 billion). The expansion includes the construction of one additional runway, subsequent enlargement of domestic and international terminals, and improvements to parking bays, car parks, and other airport infrastructure.

Once completed the expansion plans to increase passenger capacity of Suvarnabhumi Airport to 65 million per year. The new satellite passenger concourse will be linked to the current main terminal via an underground automated people mover (APM) system that was voted by the AOT board during a 17 May 2012 meeting. The new people mover is being provided by Siemens using the VAL technology. The expansion also includes a plan to expand the airport parking garage as well as the expansion of the eastern end of the main passenger terminal by  along with the construction of a new airline office building. According to the Bangkok Post, the new satellite terminal will have a total of 28 gates, with eight for the Airbus A380 super jumbo jet.

The new passenger terminal will be used only by Bangkok Airways and flag carrier Thai Airways International (and its regional subsidiary Thai Smile). Upon completion of the satellite terminal, other Star Alliance members will be given the check-in concourse of Thai Airways.

Airlines and destinations

Passenger

Cargo

Passenger traffic and statistics

Top Routes

Busiest international routes

Traffic by calendar year
Suvarnabhumi accounted for the largest share of air traffic at Thailand's airports in 2015, handling 52.9 million passengers, up by nearly 14 percent from the previous year despite its passenger capacity of only 45 million a year. International passengers passing through Suvarnabhumi grew 15.9 percent to 44.2 million, while domestic volume edged up 4.87 percent to 8.68 million. Aircraft movements showed a 9.5 percent increase to 317,066, consisting of 247,584 international (up 11 percent) and 69,482 domestic (up 4.4 percent).

Accidents and incidents

8 September 2013: Thai Airways International Flight 679, an Airbus A330-300, (HS-TEF, Song Dao), arriving from Guangzhou Baiyun International Airport (CAN) had a runway excursion from runway 19L while landing in heavy rain with extensive damage to the airplane and the runway. All passengers and crew were evacuated with no serious injuries.  Preliminary investigation determined the cause of the incident to be the right landing gear collapsing as a result of a damaged bogie. In the aftermath of the accident, Thai Airways had the logos of the aircraft painted over in black, prompting widespread criticism of attempted cover-up. An airline official initially said that the practice was part of the "crisis communication rule" recommended by Star Alliance. This was denied by the group, and Thai Airways later clarified that the "de-identifying" of aircraft was its own practice and not Star Alliance policy. The controversy prompted discussion over the appropriateness and effectiveness of the practice as a brand-protection policy. The aircraft was damaged beyond repair and written off as a hull loss. The airframe has since been converted to a roadside attraction called Airways Land, featuring a cafe and event space, on Mittraphap Road in Sida District, Nakhon Ratchasima Province.
29 September 2015: Thai Airways Airport dolly Crash Airport Cleaner At Bay 511 she death at Chularat 9 Hospital 
1 August  2016: Thai Regional Airline Flight 106,a Piper PA-31 Navajo (HS-FGB) arriving from Nakhon Ratchasima Airport with 2 Passenger Crash at Lam Phak Chi Nong Chok district Bangkok 1 Fatalities (Caption on command) and 4 injuries
8 October 2018: Thai Airways International Flight 679, a Boeing 747-400 (HS-TGF, Sri Ubon) arriving from Guangzhou Baiyun International Airport (CAN), China, had a runway excursion from runway 19R while landing, causing damage to the airplane. No injuries were reported. As of January 2020, the aircraft is being repaired at U-Tapao International Airport.
 1 July 2020 Air Zimbabwe a Boeing 767-200	(Z-WPF) flight UM462 with two passengers and 17 crew made an emergency landing because the left engine shut down
 24 July 2022 An Austrian Airlines a Boeing 777-200, registration OE-LPB performing flight OS-26 from Bangkok to Vienna was enroute at FL320 about 240nm northwest of Bangkok when the crew decided to return to Bangkok as a precaution due to a malfunctioning oven

Ground transportation

Airport Rail Link (ARL)

The 30 billion baht Suvarnabhumi Airport Link was opened on 23 August 2010, after multiple delays. The Airport Rail Link (ARL) is operated by SRTET, a subsidiary company of the State Railway of Thailand. There is a short at-grade/underground segment as the line approaches the passenger terminal building of Suvarnabhumi Airport.

The ARL Station is located on the Underground floor of Suvarnabhumi Airport which also links to the Airports' Novotel Hotel adjacent to the Main Terminal.

The ARL hours of service are 06:00 to 00:00. The ARL has two interchange stations, namely Phaya Thai (changing for BTS Green Line services) and Makkasan (linking Phetchaburi station of the MRT Blue Line). In the future, the ARL will complement the SRT Red Line commuter service, which comprises two-meter gauge, dual-track lines. The ARL may also be extended from Phaya Thai to Don Mueang via Bang Sue Grand Station, given that the old Don Mueang International Airport has now been reopened for civil aviation under a dual-airport policy.

Regional train

Meanwhile, SRT provides a suburban commuter train service between Lad Krabang (the nearest station to Suvarnabhumi on the East line, one station from the airport by Airport Rail Link) and the northern suburban city of Rangsit via downtown Bangkok and the old Don Mueang Airport. The train also connects with BTS and MRT at Phaya Thai and Phetchaburi stations respectively. A shuttle bus service linking the airport with Hua Takhe railway station is provided by BMTA. The train service is currently not as popular as the bus service because it requires a shuttle bus connection. The service will be stopped when the Airport Express Link is completed.

Bus

Northeast of the Airport is Suvarnabhumi Public Transport Center, which is the Airport's Main Bus Terminal.

A free bus service connecting Suvarnabhumi Airport and Don Mueang Airport operates from 05.00 until midnight. Three air-conditioned city bus routes are operated by Bangkok Mass Transit Authority (BMTA) serve the airport's dedicated bus terminal. There are also direct buses between the airports operated by Airport Shuttle Bus.

Taxi

Located on Level 1 (Ground Level) are where the Public Taxis are located. A ticket printed from the ticket queue machine (located on the same floor) is required before queuing up for a taxi.

Car

The airport has five main access routes. Among these the most convenient route is via the Bangkok Chon Buri Motorway (Motorway 7). Another main airport entrance is in Samut Prakan Province via the expressway from Bang Na to Bang Pakong.

The Airport has 7 different car park zones, with zone 2 & 3 having direct access to the departure/arrival terminal. Located northeast of the airport is the Longterm Car Park Zone, next to the Bus Terminal.

The airport has provided five entrance routes. The main route is via the motorway in the north of Bangkok, directly connecting Bangkok's downtown and Chonburi Province, the industrial and harbor city in eastern Thailand. However, another main airport entrance is in Samut Prakan Province, connecting an elevated highway in the south of Bangkok from Bang Na to Bang Pakong.

Sky Lane Cycle Track 

In December 2015, Airports of Thailand introduced Sky Lane, a cycling track around the Suvarnabhumi airport perimeter. The entrance to Sky Lane is located in the northeastern corner of the airport area. Cyclists can bring their bicycles and bike here for free. The Sky Lane is a controlled-access, one-direction, two-lane track built only for cycling, so the riders can be ensured that they won't be bothered by any vehicle. The Sky Lane's length is 23.5 km, making it the longest in Asia. Sky Lane's facilities, which are specially designed for cyclists, include medical facilities, shops, food & beverage, track, parking lot and a rest area. The entrance gate is open from 06:00 to 18:00.
On 23 November 2018, King Rama X presided over the official opening of cycling lane at Suvarnabhumi airport and denominated the track as Happy and Healthy Bike Lane.

References

External links

 Suvarnabhumi Airport, Official site
 Free Zone by Suvarnabhumi Airport Website
 Airports of Thailand Public Company Limited and the page of the Suvarnabhumi Airport
 Suvarnabhumi Airport Project information from Airport Technology
 

Buildings and structures in Samut Prakan province
Airports in Thailand
Transport in Bangkok
Tourism in Bangkok
Airports established in 2006
2006 establishments in Thailand